State Road 662 (SR 662) is a short east–west route that runs from Evansville toward Newburgh.

Route description
The western terminus of SR 662 begins at an interchange with Interstate 69 (I-69).  From its beginning point, SR 662 heads southeast toward Newburgh.  The route is a four-lane surface street that has a mix of commercial, business and residential traffic.

History
Formerly a  route that passed through Newburgh, SR 662 connected State Road 66 east of Newburgh with I-69 east of Evansville. In recent years, however, the highway was decommissioned through Newburgh proper, and now has a routing of slightly more than a mile from what is now I-69 to Ellerbusch Road on the west side of the town.

Major intersections

References

External links

662
Transportation in Warrick County, Indiana